Exotic Blend is the first EP by the Canadian rock group GrimSkunk released in 1992. It features Uncle Costa from Blood Sausage on Perestroïska.

Track listing 
Loaded Gun
Perestroïska
Gormenghast
Bugs In Billy Bob's Bed
It's In My Head
Nursery Rhyme

References 
 Bande à part profile

GrimSkunk albums
1992 debut EPs